Georgia competed at the 2016 Summer Olympics in Rio de Janeiro, Brazil, from 5 to 21 August 2016. This was the nation's sixth consecutive appearance at the Summer Olympics in the post-Soviet era.

Georgian National Olympic Committee sent the nation's largest ever delegation to the Games, with 40 athletes, 30 men and 10 women, competing across 12 sports. Among the sporting events represented by the nation's athletes, Georgia marked its Olympic debut in flatwater canoeing, men's tennis, women's judo, and women's weightlifting, as well as its return to fencing after two decades and rhythmic gymnastics after 16 years.

The Georgian roster was merely highlighted by pistol shooting legend and three-time medalist Nino Salukvadze, who set a historic record as the second female athlete to appear at eight Olympics, and also teamed up with her 18-year-old son and fellow shooter Tsotne Machavariani to become the first mother-son tandem competing together at a single edition. Aside from Salukvadze, ten more Georgian athletes had past Olympic experience, with archers Kristine Esebua and Khatuna Narimanidze headed to their fourth Games, and judoka Lasha Shavdatuashvili seeking to add another medal after his golden finish in London four years earlier. Other notable Georgian athletes featured world-ranked rhythmic gymnast Salome Pazhava, freestyle wrestler and 2015 world champion Vladimer Khinchegashvili (men's 57 kg), and European Games judo champion Avtandili Tchrikishvili (men's 81 kg), who was selected to lead his delegation as the flag bearer in the opening ceremony.

Georgia left Rio de Janeiro a total of seven medals (two golds, one silver, and four bronze), which matched its overall tally from the previous Olympics in London. Among the nation's medalists were Shavdatuashvili, who obtained a bronze in the men's 73 kg; his fellow judoka Varlam Liparteliani, who bounced back from his early elimination in London to earn a silver in the men's 90 kg; and Khinchegashvili, who upgraded his silver from the previous Games to a gold in freestyle wrestling. For the first time in Olympic history, two Georgian athletes shared the same podium in any sport, as weightlifter Lasha Talakhadze established a new world record to capture the men's +105 kg title, with his compatriot and London 2012 Olympian Irakli Turmanidze claiming the bronze.

Medalists

Archery
 
Georgian archers qualified each for the women's events after having secured a top eight finish in the team recurve at the 2015 World Archery Championships in Copenhagen, Denmark.

Athletics
 
Georgian athletes have so far achieved qualifying standards in the following athletics events (up to a maximum of 3 athletes in each event):

Track & road events

Field events

Canoeing

Sprint
Georgia has qualified a single boat in men's C-1 200 m for the Games by virtue of a top two national finish at the 2016 European Qualification Regatta in Duisburg, Germany, signifying the nation's Olympic debut in the sport.

Qualification Legend: FA = Qualify to final (medal); FB = Qualify to final B (non-medal)

Fencing

Georgia has entered one fencer into the Olympic competition, signifying the nation's sporting comeback for the first time since 1996. Sandro Bazadze had claimed his Olympic spot in the men's sabre by finishing among the top four individuals at the European Zonal Qualifier in Prague, Czech Republic.

Gymnastics

Rhythmic 
Georgia has qualified one rhythmic gymnast for the individual all-around by finishing in the top 15 at the 2015 World Championships in Stuttgart, Germany.

Trampoline
Georgia has qualified one gymnast in the women's trampoline by virtue of a top eight finish at the 2015 World Championships in Odense, Denmark.

Judo

Georgia has qualified a total of eight judokas for each of the following weight classes at the Games. All seven men, highlighted by London 2012 champion Lasha Shavdatuashvili and world no. 1 seed Avtandili Tchrikishvili, were ranked among the top 22 eligible judokas in the IJF World Ranking List of 30 May 2016, while Dutch-born Esther Stam at women's middleweight (70 kg) became the nation's first ever female in the sport, earning a continental quota spot from the European region as the highest-ranked Georgian judoka outside of direct qualifying position. The judo team was named to the Olympic roster on 4 June 2016.

Men

Women

Shooting
 
Georgian shooters have qualified for the following events by virtue of their best finish at the 2014 ISSF World Shooting Championships, the 2015 ISSF World Cup series, and European Championships or Games, as long as they obtained the minimum qualifying score (MQS) by 31 March 2016.

Going to her eighth straight Olympics, three-time pistol shooting medalist Nino Salukvadze joined her son Tsotne Machavariani to be officially named to the Georgian team, making them the first ever mother-son tandem in history to compete together at the same edition of the Games.

Qualification Legend: Q = Qualify for the next round; q = Qualify for the bronze medal (shotgun)

Swimming

Georgia has received a Universality invitation from FINA to send two swimmers (one male and one female) to the Olympics.

Tennis

Georgia has claimed one of six ITF Olympic men's singles places to send Nikoloz Basilashvili (world no. 101) in the men's singles into the Olympic tennis tournament.

Weightlifting

Georgian weightlifters have qualified three men's quota places for the Rio Olympics based on their combined team standing by points at the 2014 and 2015 IWF World Championships. The team must allocate these places to individual athletes by 20 June 2016.

Meanwhile, an unused women's Olympic spot was awarded to the Georgian team by IWF, as a result of Russia's complete ban from the Games due to the "multiple positive cases" of doping.

Wrestling

Georgia has qualified a total of eleven wrestlers for each the following weight classes into the Olympic tournament. Four of them finished among the top six to book Olympic spots in all men's freestyle events (except 65 & 74 kg) at the 2015 World Championships, while four more Olympic berths were awarded to Georgian wrestlers, who progressed to the top two finals at the 2016 European Qualification Tournament.

Three further wrestlers had claimed the remaining Olympic slots to round out the Georgian roster in separate World Qualification Tournaments; one of them in men's Greco-Roman 98 kg at the initial meet in Ulaanbaatar, and two more at the final meet in Istanbul.

Men's freestyle

Men's Greco-Roman

References

External links 

 

Olympics
Nations at the 2016 Summer Olympics
2016